Hilmar Smári Henningsson (born 3 September 2000) is an Icelandic basketball player for the Haukar of the Úrvalsdeild karla and the Icelandic national basketball team. In 2019, he was named the Úrvalsdeild Young Player of the Year and in 2022, he won the Icelandic Cup with Stjarnan.

Club career
Hilmar Smári started his senior team career with Haukar, appearing in 7 games during the 2016–17 Úrvalsdeild karla season. After starting the following season with Haukar, he moved to Þór Akureyri in December 2017. In 12 games with Þór, he averaged 12.2 points and 4.0 rebounds.

He returned to Haukar for the 2018–19 season and went on to average 14.0 points, 4.2 rebounds and 3.4 assists per game. After the season he was named the Úrvalsdeild Young Player of the Year.

In April 2019, Hilmar Smári had a tryout with Valencia Basket of the Liga ACB. Two months later he signed a 2-year contract with the team.

On 21 July 2021, Hilmar signed with Úrvalsdeild karla club Stjarnan. On 19 March 2022, he won his first Icelandic Basketball Cup when Stjarnan defeated reigning national champions Þór Þorlákshöfn in the 2022 Cup Finals. For the season, he averaged 12.4 points, 4.7 rebounds and 3.6 assists per game with the Stjarnan finishing 6th in the league and losing to Valur in the first round of the playoffs.

Following Haukar promotion back to the Úrvalsdeild, Hilmar signed with his hometown club in May 2022.

National team career
Hilmar Smári played his first games for the Icelandic national team during the 2019 Games of the Small States of Europe where Iceland finished third.

Personal life
Hilmar's father is Henning Henningson, who played 30 games for the Icelandic national team from 1985 to 1993. His sister is basketball player Lovísa Henningsdóttir.

Awards, titles and accomplishments

Individual awards
Úrvalsdeild Young Player of the Year: 2019

References

External links
Icelandic statistics at kki.is
Profile at realgm.com

2000 births
Living people
Hilmar Smari Henningsson
Hilmar Smari Henningsson
Hilmar Smari Henningsson
Shooting guards
Hilmar Smari Henningsson
Hilmar Smari Henningsson
Valencia Basket players
Hilmar Smari Henningsson